In 1868, a cricket team composed of Aboriginal Australians toured England between May and October of that year, thus becoming the first organised group of Australian sportspeople to travel overseas. It would be another ten years before an Australian cricket team classed as representative would leave the country.

The concept of an Aboriginal cricket team can be traced to cattle stations in the Western District of Victoria, where, in the mid-1860s, European pastoralists introduced Aboriginal station hands to the sport. An Aboriginal XI was created with the assistance of Tom Wills—captain of the Victoria cricket team and founder of Australian rules football—who acted as the side's captain-coach in the lead-up to and during an 1866–67 tour of Victoria and New South Wales. Several members of this team joined what would become the Aboriginal XI that toured England under the captaincy of Englishman Charles Lawrence.

International sporting contact was rare in this era. Previously, only three cricket teams had travelled abroad, all English: to the United States and Canada in 1859, and to Australia in 1861–62 and 1863–64.

Background

In the Western District of Victoria from the early 1860s onwards, cricket matches took place on cattle stations between Aboriginal people and European settlers. Many Aboriginal people were employed as stockmen by local station owners. The Aboriginal people were admired for their athletic skills, and in early 1866, a series of matches were staged with the intention of selecting the strongest possible Aboriginal XI. Thomas Gibson Hamilton of Bringalbert Station, near Edenhope, created a team which he coached. They played an exhibition match at Hamilton, which gained the attention of Tom Wills.

The resulting team was initially coached by local pastoralist William Hayman. Coaching duties were later turned over to Tom Wills, captain of the Victoria cricket team and founder of Australian rules football, who spoke to the team in an Aboriginal language he learnt as a child growing up in the Western District among the Djab Wurrung people. Wills' decision to join and help the team has been a source of intrigue, given that only five years earlier, he survived a massacre in Queensland in which his father and 18 other settlers were murdered by local Aboriginal people. "It was always a matter of wonder how Tom could be friendly with the blacks, considering that they murdered his father", recalled one sportswriter.

On Boxing Day 1866, in front of over 10,000 spectators, Wills captained the team against the Melbourne Cricket Club at the Melbourne Cricket Ground. Bell's Life in Victoria reported: "Seldom has a match created more excitement in Melbourne than the one under notice, and never within our recollection has a match given rise to so much feeling on behalf of the spectators." "The veteran Wills never captained an eleven who so thoroughly possessed the sympathies of the spectators," wrote a Melbourne correspondent for The Sydney Mail. "A dark skin suddenly became a passport to the good graces of Victorians." Although they lost to the MCC, the Aboriginal players were commended for their performance, and showed marked improvement on a subsequent tour of country Victoria.

An entrepreneur, Captain Gurnett, persuaded the team to travel to Sydney to begin a planned tour of the colonies and England. However, after their arrival in Sydney in February 1867, Gurnett embezzled some of the funds raised to finance the enterprise, leaving the team stranded. The team was looked after by Charles Lawrence at his Manly Hotel, he organized a number of games completing a tour of New South Wales before returning to Victoria in May. Four players succumbed to the effects of illness: Sugar and Watty died on tour while Jellico and Paddy died shortly afterward.

Team members

In 1867 Charles Lawrence was contracted to Captain/Coach Australia's 'First Eleven' that toured England in 1868. Lawrence played for Surrey, 1855, the all Ireland XI, 1862, and the all England XI, 1863. He was contracted to be the first professional cricket coach in New South Wales, and he first saw the indigenous team under the instructions of Tom Wills who played a match at the Albert Ground, Sydney. On this occasion there was some contract disagreement between the failed sponsor Gurnett and Wills, and the players were left in Sydney. Lawrence was instructed to look after the Aboriginal players. At this time Lawrence was a publican and billeted the players in his hotel in Manly until he could arrange some cricket matches to raise money to return the players to the Western District of Victoria. In 1867 he trained the players for two months at "Lake Wallace" in Edenhope in the Wimmera before selecting the below side to tour England in 1868.

The tour was financed by Sydney Lawyer George Graham along with his cousin George Smith (who had been Mayor of Sydney in 1859) and William Hayman they all travelled to England for the tour.
Charles Lawrence – Captain /Coach 
Johnny Mullagh – traditional name: Unaarrimin
 Bullocky – traditional name: Bullchanach. A wicketkeeper, Bullocky was referred to as "at once the black Bannerman and Blackham of his team".
Sundown – traditional name: Ballrin
Dick-a-Dick – traditional name: Jungunjinanuke
Johnny Cuzens – traditional name: Zellanach
King Cole – traditional name: Bripumyarrimin
Red Cap – traditional name: Brimbunyah
Twopenny – traditional name: Murrumgunarriman
Charley Dumas – traditional name: Pripumuarraman
Jimmy Mosquito – traditional name: Grougarrong, who "could walk upright under a bar and then jump it in a stander".
Tiger – traditional name: Boninbarngeet
Peter – traditional name: Arrahmunijarrimun
Jim Crow – traditional name: Jallachniurrimin

During June, King Cole died from tuberculosis and was buried in Victoria Park Cemetery in what is now Tower Hamlets in London. Sundown and Jim Crow went home in August due to ill-health.

Tour  

The team arrived in London on 13 May 1868 and were met with a degree of fascination – that being the period of the evolutionary controversies following publication of Charles Darwin's The Origin of Species in 1859. Reaction was mixed. The Times described the tourists as, "a travestie upon cricketing at Lord's", and, "the conquered natives of a convict colony." The Daily Telegraph said of Australia that, "nothing of interest comes from there except gold nuggets and black cricketers."

The first match was played at The Oval on 25 May in London and attracted 20,000 spectators. Presumably many of these spectators attended out of curiosity, rather than merely to savour a cricket contest. The Times reported: "Their hair and beards are long and wiry, their skins vary in shades of blackness, and most of them have broadly expanded nostrils. Having been brought up in the bush to agricultural pursuits under European settlers, they are perfectly civilised and are quite familiar with the English language."

The Daily Telegraph wrote: It is highly interesting and curious, to see mixed in a friendly game on the most historically Saxon part of our island, representatives of two races so far removed from each other as the modern Englishman and the Aboriginal Australian. Although several of them are native bushmen, and all are as black as night, these Indian fellows are to all intents and purposes, clothed and in their right minds.

Altogether, the Aboriginal team played 47 matches throughout England over a period of six months, winning 14, losing 14 and drawing 19; a good result that surprised many at the time. Their skills were said to range from individuals who were exceptional athletes down to two or three other team members who hardly contributed at all. The outstanding player was Johnny Mullagh. He scored 1,698 runs and took 245 wickets. An admired English fast bowler of the time, George Tarrant, bowled to Mullagh during a lunch interval and later said, "I have never bowled to a better batsman."

In addition to playing cricket, the Aboriginal players frequently put on an exhibition of boomerang and spear throwing at the conclusion of a match. Dick-a-Dick would also hold a narrow parrying shield and invite people to throw cricket balls at him, which he warded off with the shield. The Aboriginal team were narrowly beaten in a cricket-ball-throwing competition by an emerging English all-rounder of star quality, 20-year-old W. G. Grace, who threw 118 yards.

Aftermath
The team arrived back in Sydney in February 1869. They played a match against a military team the following month, then split up. Twopenny later moved to New South Wales and played for the colony against Victoria in 1870. Cuzens died of dysentery the following year. Mullagh was employed as a professional with the Melbourne Cricket Club and represented Victoria against the touring English team in 1879, when he top scored in the second innings.

The Central Board for Aborigines ruled in 1869 that it would be illegal to remove any Aboriginal person from the colony of Victoria without the approval of the government minister. This effectively curtailed the involvement of Aboriginal players in the game.

When Mullagh died aged 50 in August 1891 he was generally believed to have been the last survivor of the team (apart from Lawrence, who died in 1917). However, Red Cap is now believed to have died between 1891 and 1894, and Tarpot died in April 1900.

Legacy

In May 1988 a team of Aboriginal players, captained by John McGuire, toured England to mark the Australian Bicentenary, retracing the steps of the original tour.

2002 – The Australian Sports Hall of Fame recognised the 1868 Indigenous touring team for their contribution to sport.
2004 – The 1868 team members were presented with cap numbers by Cricket Australia.
2004 – The Johnny Mullagh interpretative centre opened in Harrow in the Wimmera.
2018 – Australia Post released a stamp celebrating 150 years since the 1868 tour.
2018 – Cricket Australia held a smoking ceremony at Johnny Mullagh's sacred water hole in Harrow celebrating 150 years since the tour.

In 2002, Charles Lawrence's great-great-grandson Ian Friend, historians and cricketers, including former Test captain Ian Chappell, successfully campaigned to have the Aboriginal XI recognised in the Sport Australia Hall of Fame. Ian Friend and Jack Kennedy (descendant of Johnny Cuzens) both accepted the award on behalf of the team. Also that year, a documentary film about the team titled A Fine Body of Gentlemen was broadcast by the ABC.

Australia sent men's and women's Aboriginal teams to England in June 2018, to mark the 150th anniversary of the tour.

A play about the cricketers called Black Cockatoo, written by Geoffrey Atherden and employing an all-Aboriginal cast, was staged at the 2020 Sydney Festival.

In January 2020, Len Pascoe encouraged singer/songwriter Matt Scullion to write a song about the tour, having been talking to Gamilaraay elder and retired cricketer Les Knox about it. Scullion wrote the song, titled "1868", and sung it at the second Twenty20 International at the Sydney Cricket Ground in early 2021, and plans to do so again at the Bradman Museum in April 2021.

Footnotes

See also

Australian cricket team
History of Test cricket (to 1883)
List of matches of the Australian Indigenous cricket team

References

Ashley Mallett, The Black Lords of Summer: The Story of the 1868 Aboriginal Tour of England and Beyond, University of Queensland, 2002.

External links
 – A new play called Black Cockatoo about the cricket team, with an all-Indigenous cast.
ATSIC article
 First Tour Scorebook – State Library of NSW
 Match results on Cricket Archive
 https://australiapostcollectables.com.au/articles/commemorating-the-first-cricket-tour-to-england

Indigenous Australian sport
Cricket Season
1868 in Australian cricket
English cricket seasons in the 19th century
Australian Aboriginals 1868
International cricket competitions from 1844 to 1888
Wergaia